The E class of US Navy blimps comprised a single airship, built during World War I by Goodyear as one of a group of three small blimps offered to the US government. Two were purchased for the US Navy and one for the US Army. The Navy blimps were designated E-1, F-1, and the Army airship A-1. These airships had identical envelopes but different cars. The E-1 was delivered to Pensacola, Florida in December 1918. It was flown only at Pensacola serving as a trainer at the Airship School. A new envelope was provided in December 1920. E-1 was retired from service sometime in 1924.

Operators

United States Navy

Specifications

See also

References

1910s United States military trainer aircraft
Airships of the United States Navy
Goodyear aircraft
Aircraft first flown in 1918